"Monkey Man" is a 1969 song by the ska and reggae group the Toots & the Maytals, reaching number 47 on the UK Singles Chart.  The song is about a girl choosing another man over Toots.  Toots & the Maytals re-recorded the song on True Love with third wave ska band No Doubt.

Other versions
The song has been frequently covered by other artists, most famously by British ska group the Specials and British singer Amy Winehouse. Versions by British reggae MC General Levy and American ska punk band Reel Big Fish charted on the UK Singles Chart, in 1993 and 2003 respectively. Japanese experimental rock band Melt-Banana, South-London ska group the Dualers and Argentinian band Los Pericos also covered the song.
 
In 2009, Australian singer Kylie Minogue and the Wiggles recorded a version of the song to raise funds for UNICEF.

Chart performance

References

1969 songs
1969 singles
Toots and the Maytals songs
Songs written by Toots Hibbert
Song recordings produced by Leslie Kong
The Specials songs
General Levy songs